Hollywood Cemetery is a large, sprawling cemetery located next to Richmond, Virginia's Oregon Hill neighborhood at 412 South Cherry Street. Characterized by rolling hills and winding paths overlooking the James River, it is the resting place of two United States Presidents, James Monroe and John Tyler, as well as the only Confederate States President, Jefferson Davis.   It is also the resting place of 28 Confederate generals, more than any other cemetery in the country; these include George Pickett and J.E.B. Stuart.

History
The land that Hollywood Cemetery currently stands on was once part of William Byrd III's estate.  Later, it was owned by the Harvie family and was known as "Harvie's Woods." William H. Haxall was one of the original founders of Hollywood Cemetery. In the spring of 1847, two citizens of Richmond, Joshua J. Fry and William H. Haxall, while on a visit to Boston, visited Mount Auburn Cemetery, a beautiful cemetery near that city. They were impressed by the solemn grandeur of the place and resolved that they would, on their return to Richmond, propose the establishment of a rural cemetery near the city. It was through their original efforts and the subsequent cooperation of local citizens that Hollywood Cemetery was created. On June 3, 1847, Haxall, Fry, William Mitchell Jr., and Isaac Davenport Sr. purchased from Lewis E. Harvie, who sold under a deed of trust from Jacqueline B. Harvie for the sum of $4,075, a certain portion of the lots or parcels of land in the town of Sydney, in the County of Henrico, together with "the privileges and appurtenances to the belonging, which said portion is adjoining to Clarkes Spring and contains by survey forty-two acres, three roods, but of which one rood, known as Harvie's rood, or graveyard, with free ingress and egress to the said graveyard is reserved." This purchase was made with the design of establishing a rural cemetery. Hollywood Cemetery was designed as a garden cemetery, or park cemetery, which was the trend at the time borrowed from the French in an effort to provide more green space in urban areas.In the late 1840s, William Haxall, William Mitchell Jr. and Joshua Fry hired John Notman (architect of Laurel Hill Cemetery in Philadelphia) to design the cemetery in the rural garden style. Its name, "Hollywood," came from the holly trees dotting the hills of the property. Oliver P. Baldwin delivered the dedication address in 1849.

James Monroe was reinterred from New York City to the "President's Circle" section of Hollywood cemetery on July 4, 1858, due to the efforts of Governor Henry A. Wise.

It was a project supported by the Hollywood Ladies Memorial Association, a group of Southern women dedicated to honoring and caring for the burial sites of fallen Confederate soldiers.

The placing of the capstone at the top of the pyramid has been a source of legend for Richmonders. The legend states that, as it was nearing completion, no one could determine how to place the capstone atop the lofty 90-foot pyramid. Thomas Stanley, a criminal in the work gang building the pyramid, proposed and executed the solution, which involved a dangerous climb to the top. In retellings, locals say Stanley was freed due to his heroic contribution. The only evidence of this is a note reading "transferred" added to the release box of Stanley's prison schedule. This note could be interpreted as an attempt to obscure the extrajudicial granting of his freedom or that he was simply moved to a different prison or project.

The pyramid became a symbol of the Hollywood Memorial Association, appearing on its stationery as well as on the front of a pamphlet of buried soldiers, the Register of the Confederate Dead.

In 1890, a chapel was constructed next to the entrance of the cemetery. This chapel now serves as the cemetery office. In 1915, the original entrance was closed and the present one was opened to better facilitate cars.

The Palmer Chapel Mausoleum was built 1992, adding 730 crypts for caskets and 160 cremation niches.

Hollywood Cemetery is one of Richmond's major tourist attractions. There are many local legends surrounding certain tombs and grave sites in the cemetery, including one about a little girl and the black iron statue of a dog standing watch over her grave. Other notable legends rely on ghosts haunting the many mausoleums. One of the most well-known of these is the legend of the Richmond Vampire.

A place rich in history, legend, and gothic landscape, Hollywood Cemetery is also frequented by many of the local students attending Virginia Commonwealth University.

Confederate Memorial Day 
In the 1870s, the South was crumbling, and southerners yearned to preserve their culture and heritage. One preservation effort was Confederate Memorial Day, a series of celebrations that “became imbued with cultural and religious symbolism that underscored the gravity of what it meant to be a southerner.” Though some of these celebrations were ornate with speeches, poems, and prayers, the ones at Hollywood Cemetery were simple, and ultimately set the trend for future celebrations: a modest procession to the cemetery and decoration of the graves. Young men would also recreate Thomas Stanley's heroic act and climb the monument to hang a wreath from the top. Though simple, it is estimated that around 20,000 people attended the first Confederate Memorial Day at Hollywood Cemetery in 1866.

List of notable interments and their families
(Note: This is a partial list.)

Use the following alphabetical links to find names.

A
 Alden Aaroe (1918–1993), broadcast journalist
 Carl William Ackerman (1890–1970), journalist, author and educational administrator, the first dean of the Columbia School of Journalism
 Adeline Detroit Wood Atkinson (1841–1916), hotelier and proprietor of Hotel Richmond
 Joseph R. Anderson (1813–1892), civil engineer, industrialist, soldier
 T. Coleman Andrews (1899–1983), Commissioner of Internal Revenue, presidential candidate of the State's Rights Democratic Party in 1956
 James J. Archer (1817–1864), Confederate General, American Civil War
 Grace Evelyn Arents (1848–1926), philanthropist, niece of Lewis Ginter

B
 William Barret (1786–1871), businessman, tobacco manufacturer in his time considered to have been the wealthiest man in Richmond
 Lloyd James Beall (1808–1887), American military officer and paymaster of U.S. Army, Colonel Commandant of the Confederate States Marine Corps for the entire length of the War
 Frederic W. Boatwright (1868–1951), President of the University of Richmond (1895–1946)
 Kate Langley Bosher (1865–1932), author, suffragette
 John Fulmer Bright (1877–1953), politician, physician
 John M. Brockenbrough (1830–1892), Confederate Army colonel and brigade commander at Gettysburg
 Dave Brockie (1963–2014) musician, painter, author, and actor. Brockie portrayed Oderus Urungus, lead singer of the band Gwar
 Benjamin Thomas Brockman (1831–1864), merchant and Confederate officer
 James Andrew Bryant Jun 27th 1862 34th NC. Walter Bailoch Stewert EARL OF MENTEITH Descendant. Royal Stewarts y-Dna project James Brian 1760-1830 York county SC.

C
 James Branch Cabell (1879–1958), fantasy fiction novelist
 James E. Cannon (1873–1942), Virginia state senator (1914–23)
 John Samuels Caskie (1821–1869), U.S. Congressman (1851–59)
 Ralph T. Catterall (1897–1978), judge, Virginia State Corporation Commission (1949–73)
 Robert H. Chilton (1815–1879), US Army Officer, Confederate General, American Civil War
 Philip St. George Cocke (1809–1861), Confederate General, American Civil War
 Raleigh Edward Colston (1825–1896), Confederate Civil War general and VMI professor
 Asbury Christian Compton (1929–2006), Justice, Supreme Court of Virginia (1974–2000)
 John Rogers Cooke (1833–1891), Confederate General, American Civil War
 Edward Cooper (1873–1928), U.S. Congressman (1915–19)
 Jabez Lamar Monroe Curry (1825–1903), U.S. and Confederate Congressman, Civil War veteran, and President of Howard College in Alabama and Richmond College in Virginia. His statue is in Statuary Hall in the U.S. Capitol

D

 Virginius Dabney (1901–1995) author, journalist, editor of the Richmond Times-Dispatch from 1936 to 1969, Pulitzer Prize winner
 Peter V. Daniel (1784–1860), U.S. Supreme Court Associate Justice
 Robert Williams Daniel (1884–1940), Virginia State Senator and RMS Titanic survivor.  Father of Robert Daniel
 Robert Daniel (1936–2012), U.S. Representative from Virginia.  Son of Robert Williams Daniel
 Jefferson Davis (1808–1889), President of the Confederate States of America
 Varina Anne "Winnie" Davis (1864–1898), author, daughter of Jefferson Davis
 Varina Howell Davis, (1826–1906), author best known as First Lady of the CSA, wife of Jefferson Davis
 Hal Douglas (1924–2014), radio and television voice over artist

E
 Edward Edmonds (1835–1863), Confederate Colonel of the 38th Virginia Infantry, killed-in-action during Pickett's Charge
 Tazewell Ellett (1856–1914), U.S. Representative from Virginia
 James Taylor Ellyson (1847–1919), Lieutenant Governor of Virginia (1906–18)

F
 Douglas Southall Freeman (1886–1953), journalist and historian; author of definitive biographies of George Washington and Confederate General Robert E. Lee; namesake of a local high school

G

 Richard B. Garnett (1817–1863), U.S. Army officer and Confederate general killed during Battle of Gettysburg
 Julian Vaughan Gary (1892–1973), Member United States Congress (1945–65)
 Robert Atkinson Gibson (d. 1919), Bishop of the Episcopal Diocese of Virginia (1902–19)
 Lewis Ginter (1824–1897), tobacco executive, philanthropist
 Ellen Glasgow (1873–1945), Pulitzer Prize winning novelist
 Thomas Christian Gordon, Jr. (1915–2003), Justice, Supreme Court of Virginia (1965–1972)
 Peachy R. Grattan (1801–1881), lawyer and law reporter
 Charles Philip Gruchy (died 1921), Private, 3rd Battalion, Canadian Infantry – only British Commonwealth war grave in the cemetery
 Walter Gwynn (1802–1882), Confederate Brigadier General

H
 James Dandridge Halyburton (1803–1879), U.S. and Confederate judge, Eastern District of Virginia (1843–65)
 David Bullock Harris (1814–1864), Confederate Colonel
 John Harvie (1742–1807), lawyer and builder, delegate to the Continental Congress, Signer of The Articles of Confederation
 William Wirt Henry (1831–1900), lawyer, member of the General Assembly of Va., president of the Am. Historical Association (1890–91)
 Henry Heth (1825–1899), U.S. Army officer and Confederate general, participated at the Battle of Gettysburg
 Ambrose Powell Hill, Jr. (1825–1865), Confederate General
 Eppa Hunton (1822–1908), U.S. Representative and Senator, Confederate brigadier general
 Eppa Hunton Jr. (1855–1932), lawyer, member of the House of Delegates, president of the Virginia Bar Association
 Eppa Hunton IV (1904–1976), lawyer, rector of Virginia Commonwealth University

I
 John D. Imboden (1823–1895), lawyer, teacher, Virginia legislator, Confederate cavalry general and partisan fighter

J
 Edward Johnson (1816–1873), U.S. Army officer and Confederate general, American Civil War
 Mary Johnston (1870–1936), novelist and women's rights advocate
 David Rumph Jones (1825–1863), U.S Army officer and Confederate General, American Civil War
 Samuel Jones (1819–1887), U.S. Army, Confederate General, American Civil War

K
 Wythe Leigh Kinsolving (1878–1964), Episcopal priest, writer, poet, political advocate

L
 John Lamb (1840–1924), U.S. Congressman (1897–1913)
 Fitzhugh Lee (1835–1905), Confederate cavalry general, Governor of Virginia, diplomat, U.S. Army general in Spanish–American War and the nephew of General Robert E. Lee
 Thomas M. Logan (1840–1914), Confederate General
 James Lyons (1801–1882), politician, Confederate Congressman

M

 Hunter McGuire (1835–1900), Confederate Army surgeon who amputated General Thomas J. "Stonewall" Jackson's arm after Jackson was mistakenly shot by Confederate soldiers at Chancellorsville . (Despite McGuire's efforts, Jackson later died of pneumonia.) After the war, McGuire founded the Virginia College of Medicine, and was president of the American Medical Association
 Angus William McDonald (1799–1864), American military officer and lawyer in the U.S. state of Virginia and colonel in the Confederate States Army
 David Gregg McIntosh (1836–1916), lawyer, Confederate officer
 John Marshall (1823–1862), editor of the Jackson Mississippian and Austin Star-Gazette. Appointed a Colonel in the Texas Volunteer Infantry during the Civil War, he was killed in action at the Battle of Gaines Mill
 John Young Mason (1799–1859), U.S. Secretary of the Navy (1844–45, 1846–49), U.S. Attorney General (1845–46)
 Matthew Fontaine Maury (1806–1873), oceanographer, scientist, author, and educator; first superintendent of the U.S. Navy Observatory
 William Mayo (c. 1685–1744), Colonial civil engineer
 David J. Mays (1896–1971) author and lawyer
 Robert Merhige (1919–2005), Federal judge
 John Lucas Miller (1831–1864), attorney, Confederate colonel
 Polk Miller (1844–1913), pharmacist and musician
 Willis Dance Miller (1893–1960), Justice, Virginia Supreme Court of Appeals (1947–60)
 James Monroe (1758–1831), fifth President of the United States
 Elizabeth Kortright Monroe (1768–1830), U.S. First Lady, wife of James Monroe
 Richard Channing Moore (1762–1841), Second Bishop of the Episcopal Diocese of Virginia (1814–41)
 Samuel P. Moore (1813–1889), Confederate Surgeon General
 Mary-Cooke Branch Munford (1865–1938), civic leader; education, women's suffrage, and civil rights activist

O
 Charles Triplett O'Ferrall (1840–1905), Governor of Virginia (1894–98)
 Robert Ould (1820–1882), Attorney, Confederate official

P

 Emma Gilham Page (1855–1933), wife of William Nelson Page
 Mann Page (1835–1904) Grand Master of Masons of Virginia 1894, American Civil War soldier, Co. F. 21st Virginia Infantry
 William Nelson Page (1854–1932), civil engineer, railway industrialist, co-founder of the Virginian Railway
 William Henry Palmer (1835–1926), Confederate officer
 Sallie Partington (1834–1907), actress
 John Pegram (1832–1865), U.S. Army officer, Confederate Army brigadier general
 William Ransom Johnson Pegram (1841–1865), U.S. Army officer, Confederate Army colonel
 George Pickett (1825–1875), U.S. Army officer, Confederate Army general, participated in Battle of Gettysburg
 LaSalle Corbell Pickett (1843–1931), author, wife of George Pickett
 William Swan Plumer (1802–1880), Presbyterian clergyman, educator and author
 Frederick Gresham Pollard (1918–2003), Lieutenant Governor of Virginia from 1966–70
 John Garland Pollard (1871–1937), Governor of Virginia from 1930–34
 Robert Nelson Pollard (1880–1954), Judge, U.S. District Court for the Eastern District of Virginia from 1936 to 1954
 William Wortham Pool (1842–1922), bookkeeper; tomb became associated with the Richmond Vampire
 John Pope, business executive (Allen & Ginter) (1856–96)
 John Powell (1882–1963), composer, ethnomusicologist and segregationist
 Lewis Franklin Powell, Jr. (1907–1998), U.S. Supreme Court justice
 Bennet Puryear Jr. (1884–1982), Major General, USMC

R
 John Randolph (1773–1833), politician, leader in Congress from Virginia
 William Francis Rhea (1858–1931), Virginia lawyer, judge, and U.S. Congressman
 Dr. William Rickman (1731–1783), director of hospitals for the Continental Army of Virginia; devoted husband to the daughter of Signer of the Declaration of Independence Benjamin Harrison, Miss Elizabeth Harrison
 Conway Robinson (1805–1884), lawyer and legal scholar

S
 Dave Edward Satterfield, Jr. (1894–1946), U.S. Congressman 1937–46
 Conrad Frederick Sauer (1866–1927), founder of the C. F. Sauer Company
 James Benjamin Sclater Jr. (1847–1882), co-founder of the Pi Kappa Alpha fraternity
 Mary Wingfield Scott (1898–1983), historic preservationist
 James Alexander Seddon (1815–1880), U.S. Congressman (1845–1851); Confederate Secretary of War
 Henry G. Shirley (1874–1941), Virginia civil servant
 George Alvin Smith (1844–1908), merchant
 William Alexander Smith (1828–1888), U.S. Congressman from North Carolina (1873–75)
 William "Extra Billy" Smith (1797–1887), two-time governor of Virginia, Confederate general
 Harold Fleming Snead (1903–1987), Justice, Supreme Court of Virginia (1957–74)
 William E. Starke (1814–1862), Confederate general killed at the Battle of Antietam
 Walter Husted Stevens (1827–1867), U.S. Army lieutenant, C.S.A general
 Isaac M. St. John (1827–1880), Confederate General, American Civil War
 J. E. B. Stuart (1833–1864), American soldier, Confederate Army general
 Claude Augustus Swanson (1862–1939), Governor of Virginia (1906–10), U.S. Secretary of the Navy (1933–39)

T

 John Banister Tabb (1845–1909), poet and priest
 William Elam Tanner (1836–1898), businessman
 William R. Terry (1827–1897), C.S.A general, American Civil War
 John Randolph Tucker (1879–1954), lawyer and civic leader
 Edna Henry Lee Turpin (1867–1952), author
 David Gardiner Tyler (1846–1927), Democratic politician, U.S. Congressman, and the fourth son of President John Tyler
 John Tyler (1790–1862), tenth President of the United States, a delegate to the Provisional Confederate Congress in 1861, and elected to the House of Representatives of the Confederate Congress
 Julia Gardiner Tyler (1820–1889), U.S. First Lady, wife of John Tyler
 Lyon Gardiner Tyler (1853–1935), historian, president of the College of William and Mary and the seventh son of President John Tyler

V
 Edward Valentine (1838–1930), sculptor
 Lila Meade Valentine (1865–1921), health care and education reformer, suffragist

W
 Edmund Waddill, Jr. (1855–1931), U.S. Congressman (1889–1891); U.S. judge Fourth Circuit Court of Appeals (1921–31)
 Reuben Lindsay Walker (1827–1890), Confederate Army general
 Alexander Wilbourne Weddell (1876–1948), U.S. Ambassador to Argentina (1933–39) and Spain (1939–42)
 Beverly R. Wellford (1797–1870), Sixth President of the American Medical Association
 Louis O. Wendenburg (1861–1934), Member of the Senate of Virginia (1912–20)
 John Baker White (1794–1862), American military officer, lawyer, civil servant, and Clerk of Court for Hampshire County, Virginia (1815–61)
 Francis McNeece Whittle (1823–1902), Bishop of the Episcopal Diocese of Virginia (1876–1902)
 John A. Wilcox (1819–1864), U.S. Congressman (1851–1853); Confederate Congressman
 Channing Moore Williams (1829–1910), Missionary Bishop of the Episcopal Diocese of China and Japan
 Richard Leroy Williams (1923–2011), U.S. district court judge Eastern District of Virginia (1980–2011)
 George Douglas Wise (1831–1908), U.S. Congressman (1881–95)
 Henry A. Wise (1806–1876), Governor of Virginia, Confederate Army general
 John Sergeant Wise (1846–1913), U.S. Congressman (1883–85)
 Richard Alsop Wise (1843–1900), U.S. Congressman (1897–1901)
 Tom Wolfe (1930-2018), American author and journalist known for his association with New Journalism
 Serge Wolkonsky  (1860–1937), Russian theatrical worker, son of Mikhail Sergeevich

Gallery

See also
 List of cemeteries in the United States
 Oregon Hill
 William Byrd Community House
 St. Andrew's Church
 Tredeger Iron Works
 Oakwood Cemetery (Richmond, Virginia)

References

Further reading

External links

 
 Hollywood Cemetery, Richmond, Virginia, a National Park Service Discover Our Shared Heritage Travel Itinerary
 Early 20th Century Views of Hollywood Cemetery, Rarely Seen Richmond Postcard Collection, VCU Libraries.
 James Monroe Tomb, Hollywood Cemetery, Richmond, Independent City, VA: 6 photos, 1 color transparency, 6 data pages, and 1 photo caption page at Historic American Buildings Survey
 List of Confederate Hospitals in Richmond, VA, during the Civil War
 
 

 
Historic American Buildings Survey in Virginia
1849 establishments in Virginia
Cemeteries in Richmond, Virginia
Cemeteries on the National Register of Historic Places in Virginia
Confederate States of America cemeteries
James River (Virginia)
National Register of Historic Places in Richmond, Virginia
Tourist attractions in Richmond, Virginia
Historic districts on the National Register of Historic Places in Virginia
Rural cemeteries
Tombs of presidents of the United States